Richard Molyneux may refer to:

 Richard le Molyneux (fl. 1312), MP for Lancashire
 Richard Molyneux (died 1397) (1368–1397), MP for Lancashire
 Sir Richard Molyneux, 1st Baronet (1560–1622), MP for Lancashire
 Richard Molyneux, 1st Viscount Molyneux (1594–1636), MP for Lancashire and Wigan
 Richard Molyneux, 2nd Viscount Molyneux (died 1654), Royalist officer in the English Civil War
 Dick Molyneux (1858–1906), association football manager